Lazare Buandet, a French landscape painter, was born in Paris in 1755. He painted views of Paris, and sought to imitate Ruisdael. In the Louvre there is by him a 'View in the Forest of Fontainebleau,' signed and dated 1785. He died in Paris in 1803.

References
 

18th-century French painters
French male painters
19th-century French painters
Landscape artists
1755 births
1803 deaths
Painters from Paris
19th-century French male artists
18th-century French male artists